James E. Morin (May 10, 1849 – October 7, 1902) was an Ontario merchant and political figure. He represented Welland in the Legislative Assembly of Ontario as a Liberal from 1883 to 1890.

He was born in County Limerick, Ireland, the son of Michael Morin, and emigrated to Canada West with his family in 1851. Morin studied at a commercial college in Buffalo, New York. He worked in a general store owned by E. Cutler at Ridgeway, becoming owner of the business and expanding into the manufacturing of flour. In 1870, in Fort Erie, Ontario, he married Jeanette Ann Wilson. Morin was clerk for Bertie Township and auditor for Welland County. He served in the local militia during the Fenian raids and later reached the rank of lieutenant-colonel. Morin also served as justice of the peace, license commissioner and chairman of the school board. In 1891, he was named registrar for Welland County. Morin died in Ridgeway, Ontario.

External links 
The Canadian parliamentary companion, 1887 JA Gemmill
Member's parliamentary history for the Legislative Assembly of Ontario 
The History of the County of Welland, Ontario, its past and present (1887)
The Canadian men and women of the time : a handbook of Canadian biography, HJ Morgan (1898)

1849 births
1902 deaths
Ontario Liberal Party MPPs
Irish emigrants to Canada (before 1923)
People of the Fenian raids
Canadian justices of the peace